Draško Božović (Cyrillic: Дpaшкo Бoжoвић, born 30 June 1988 in Titograd, SFR Yugoslavia) is a Montenegrin footballer, who currently plays for Dečić.

Club career
He played for Sutjeska Nikšić, FK Budućnost, FK Mogren and FK Mladost in the Montenegrin First League.

International career
Božović made his debut for Montenegro in an August 2010 friendly match against Northern Ireland and has earned a total of 3 caps, scoring no goals. His final international was an October 2011 European Championship qualification match against Switzerland.

References

External links

1988 births
Living people
Footballers from Podgorica
Association football midfielders
Serbia and Montenegro footballers
Montenegrin footballers
Montenegro under-21 international footballers
Montenegro international footballers
FK Budućnost Podgorica players
FK Mogren players
Hapoel Be'er Sheva F.C. players
NK Domžale players
FK Lovćen players
FK Sutjeska Nikšić players
FK Rudar Pljevlja players
FC Prishtina players
First League of Serbia and Montenegro players
Montenegrin First League players
Slovenian PrvaLiga players
Israeli Premier League players
Football Superleague of Kosovo players
Montenegrin expatriate footballers
Expatriate footballers in Israel
Montenegrin expatriate sportspeople in Israel
Expatriate footballers in Slovenia
Montenegrin expatriate sportspeople in Slovenia
Expatriate footballers in Kosovo
Montenegrin expatriate sportspeople in Kosovo